Heidi Crebo-Rediker is an American economist who served from 2012 to 2013 as the first chief economist of the United States Department of State.

Education 
Crebo-Rediker earned a Bachelor of Arts degree in Russian area studies from Dartmouth College and a Master of Science from the London School of Economics. From 1990 to 1992, Crebo-Rediker resided on the island of Sakhalin, Russia, where she reportedly learned to catch salmon with her bare hands.

Career 
Early in her career, Crebo-Rediker worked for Bear Stearns, Lehman Brothers, and Merrill. From 2009 to 2012, Crebo-Rediker worked as chief of international finance and economics for the United States Senate Committee on Foreign Relations. She then served as the first chief economist of the United States Department of State from 2012 to 2013. She is the CEO of International Capital Strategies.

Potential Biden Administration appointment 
On April 30, 2021, Bloomberg News reported that Crebo-Rediker's name was being considered by the Biden administration for the position of under secretary of the treasury for international affairs. However, on July 12, 2021, Bloomberg reported that the potential nomination had been withdrawn.

Personal life 
Crebo-Rediker is married to Douglas Rediker, a non-resident senior fellow at the Brookings Institution.

References 

Living people
American economists
Dartmouth College alumni
Alumni of the London School of Economics
Obama administration personnel
United States Department of State officials
Year of birth missing (living people)